Todd Decker is an American musicologist. He is the Paul Tietjens Professor of Music at Washington University in St. Louis. Decker edited the journal American Music from 2020 to 2022.

Decker was graduated from Fresno Pacific College in 1989, then earned a Master of Music degree in harpsichord from the San Francisco Conservatory of Music in 1991. He completed his Ph.D. at the University of Michigan in 2007 and joined the faculty of Washington University in St. Louis that same year.

Decker's research, teaching, and publications generally focus on American popular music from 1920 to the present, with particular emphasis on the Broadway and Hollywood musical, Hollywood film music (and sound), the recorded popular music industry, and pre-1970 jazz.

Expert witness

In 2019, Decker testified as an expert witness in a lawsuit against Katy Perry, stating that Christian rapper Flame produced a "unique" eight-note ostinato — a repeating sequence of musical figures within a song — which Flame's legal team claimed Perry plagiarized. Decker further testified that the ostinatos used in Perry's 2013 song "Dark Horse" and Flame's 2008 song "Joyful Noise" share "five or six points of similarity." A jury verdict that found the Katy Perry song did infringe the copyright of Flames's song was overturned on appeal on the March 16, 2020. US District Court judge Christina A Snyder said "It is undisputed in this case" that the ostinato was "not a particularly unique or rare combination."

Publications
Books

References

Year of birth missing (living people)
Living people
Washington University in St. Louis faculty
American musicologists
Fresno Pacific University alumni
San Francisco Conservatory of Music alumni
University of Michigan alumni